The Enrique Olaya Herrera National Park (Spanish: Parque Nacional Enrique Olaya Herrera), better known as National Park (Spanish: Parque Nacional) is a park located in the Eastern hills of Bogotá, in the northeast of the locality of Santa Fe. 

The inauguration of the park took place on August 6, 1934. President Enrique Olaya Herrera attended at its inauguration and was one of its most important promoters, hence its full name includes the mention of the president. Its heritage and tradition is very rich and today forms part of the image of the city. It was declared a National Monument of Colombia on September 26, 1996.

It is located at a height between 2,600 and 3,150 meters above sea level. Between the streets 36 and 39 with carreras Seventh and Fifth the park keeps its original layout, which resembles an inverted triangle with roads that connect the different monuments of the park. It has 283 hectares of extension. Its eastern sector is crossed by the Arzobispo River.

On its grounds there is a small aviary, field hockey courts, a roller skating ring, a soccer field, volleyball courts, basketball courts, a theater and a playground. It also has a main grove in which stands the monumental fountain in honor of Rafael Uribe Uribe, made in 1940 by Spanish sculptor Victorio Macho and inaugurated on October 27, 1940. The grove continues eastward for a pedestrian path adorned with benches and lanterns, ending in a small plaza with a clock tower, donated by the Swiss community of the city in 1938. The park has other monuments, among which stands out a sculpture by Enrique Grau called Rita 5:30 pm, inaugurated in 2000.

The children's theater, with capacity for 300 children, was built in 1936 by the architect Carlos Martínez and was declared a National Monument of Colombia by decree 1802 of October 19, 1995. On its western side are the sports fields and stalls for food vendors.

The eastern section has a considerable amount of flora and fauna, water sources and extensive tree planting. The Arzobispo river crosses it from east to west after descending from the Eastern hills of the city.

References

External links

 Official website (in Spanish)

Parks in Bogotá